Rana Vikrama is a 2015 Indian Kannada-language action thriller film directed by Pavan Wadeyar featuring Puneeth Rajkumar in a dual role, Anjali and Adah Sharma. The film released on 10 April 2015. The soundtrack of the film was released on 21 March 2015. Rana Vikrama was released on 10 April 2015 where it received positive reviews from critics and audience where the film became a commercial success at the box office.

Plot
On 14 August 1947, Viceroy Louise Batten tortures and shoots a defiant Kannadiga, but the Kannadiga slits Louise Batten's throat, who soon dies along with the Kannadiga. 

In 2015, A reporter is killed in a place called Vikramatheertha, which is not on the Karnataka map.  She had earlier sent a letter to Home minister K.V. Anand Rao. When she later disappears, Rao asks the police commissioner to send a newer recruit officer to investigate. Vikram, who aspires to become a cop is rejected by the department as he refuses to give a bribe. Along with his girlfriend Paaru, he meets Anand Rao, who assigns him for the mission. Vikram goes to Vikramatheertha, in Maharashtra, and finds out that the people are actually enslaved by Patil to illegally export soil to an unknown buyer. After being insulted, he thrashes up Patil and his henchmen and sends him into a coma. 

Meanwhile, Patil's brother Kulkarni, who is Maharashtra's ruling party MLA, hears of Patil's coma and sends goons against Vikram, but to no avail. Vikram frees and organizes the people to order the area, and goes to change the border between the states. On the way, he thrashes some of Kulkarni's goons right in front of Kulkarni and warns him not to interfere. Vikram reports to Anand Rao with his findings, including an old Halegannada inscriptions, the people who speak Kannada and also about Kulkarni. In the meantime, Vikram and the people excavate Vikramateertha and find many artifacts that they restore to their former glory, and the pictures of the artifacts are sent to Rao, who later tells Vikram that the Central government has given approval for the site to be developed. Vikram requests that the annexement of the site should be developed on Kannada Rajyotsava to show Karnataka of their heritage.

Meanwhile, Johnson, who is the grandson of Louise Batten calls Kulkarni, who is helping Johnson smuggle the soil of Vikramatheertha, to ensure everything is fine. He signs a contract for £10 billion dollars and will give Kulkarni  in exchange for triple the soil. Rao reveals about Vikramatheertha's exploits and Vikramateertha's belonging to Karnataka to the media, where Johnson and Kulkarni learns of the news, Kulkarni then relays everything to Johnson and begs him to come to India. On the day of Kannada Rajyotsava, While Anand Rao is talking about Vikramateertha belonging to Karnataka, Vikram's grandmother Gowri wakes up from her long inactivity and Vikram visits her ailing grandmother, who reveals her and his grandfather's past.

In 1947, Vikramateertha was a thriving village with a famous Lord Shiva temple. Gowri, the daughter of the village headman Kusti Ranganna, falls in love with her father's student Rana Vikrama, where they get married. Meanwhile, the area is under the control of Viceroy Louis Batten, who is only interested in gaining profits. One of his scientist found 100% uranium in Vikramatheertha's soil. Afterwards, one of the British collaborators tells the villagers they must vacate the village, but they refuse at which Batten kills Kusti Ranganna, only for Vikram to attack him. Humiliated, Batten sends a large army forces to forcibly evict or kill the villagers. The villagers fight back with stones and bare hands, but the guns and cannons of the enemy force them back. Vikrama tells Gowri and remaining villagers to flee and returns to fight the British. However, he is betrayed by his own partner Ashoka and is handed over to Batten. Batten tortures him mortally, but he slashes the throat of the evil britisher before his death (which is shown in the beginning). 

At present, Johnson gruesomly bombs the site, causing many deaths and the government is humiliated. Anand Rao assigns Vikram to investigate behind the bombing. Vikram convinces Rao of the need to kill Johnson for the safety of the country and state, to prevent the uranium from getting into the hands of terrorists. Vikram goes to find and kill Johnson with his squad officers, but Johnson escapes and has Vikram's own team double cross him. After dispatching the squad, Vikram arrives at the mines where Johnson is supervising the loading of the uranium and chases him along a train. After a fight, Vikram is stabbed, but kills Johnson, where he is promoted to ACP by Anand Rao, much to the happiness of his family and Paaru.

Cast
 Puneeth Rajkumar as Rana Vikrama & ACP Vikrama (Dual Role)
 Anjali as Gowri
 Adah Sharma as Paaru
 Girish Karnad as K.V. Anand Rao – Home Minister of Karnataka state.
 Dinesh Mangalore as Kulakarni
 Vikram Singh as Johnson and Louis Batten, Viceroy of Company Government (dual role)
 Ashok 
 Sudha Belawadi as Vikram's mother 
 "Mukhyamantri" Chandru as Chief Minister of Karnataka state
 Avinash as 'Kusti' Ranganna
 Harsha BM

Production
It was reported in October 2013 that Pavan Wadeyar would direct Puneeth Rajkumar in this film which was announced to be produced by Jayanna Combines. The film was officially launched along with a teaser on 17 March 2014. Puneeth Rajkumar who turned 39 on 17 March, celebrated his birthday amidst a huge crowd at Kanteerava Studios while he also took part in the launch of his next project with Pavan Wadeyar. The entire family of Rajkumar was present at the Kanteerava studios to wish Puneeth Rajkumar on his birthday and for his next project. It was Shiva Rajkumar who clapped for the first shot while Parvathamma Rajkumar switched on the camera. According to Pavan, Puneeth Rajkumar will be seen as a student and a cop in this film.

Popular Tamil-Telugu actress Anjali returned to Sandalwood in this film, breaking a seven-year hiatus. Adah Sharma was selected as the other heroine, after Rachita Ram opted out. Hindi actor Vikram Singh was roped to play main antagonist role.

Filming
The regular shooting of the movie started from 9 June 2014 in Bangalore. To shoot the key scenes of the movie, a massive outdoor set was erected at hampi on the bank of the Tungabadra river, and it is said to be one of the most expensive outdoor sets for a Kannada movie. Actor Yash visited the shooting spot at Hampi. It is the first of movie Puneeth which shot at Hampi while his father Dr Rajkumar and brother Shiva Rajkumar had a film shot there earlier. The introduction scene of Adah Sharma was shot at MG Road Metro railway station, Bangalore thus becoming first Kannada movie to shoot at Namma Metro. The other major scenes were shot at Bangalore, Belagavi, Hospete, Sandur and near Donimalai. The second official teaser of the movie was released with Tamil Lingaa movie on 12 December 2014. The major climax scene was canned at Jindal Factory, Bellary for 18 days. It was reported that the makers of the film had invested a whopping Rs 1.25 crore in the climax. Director Pavan Wadeyar in order to create a high-octane climax in the film got a 10 kg gun especially designed for the film. The 16-member team of Ranavikrama wrapped up the last schedule of shooting in Milan, Italy in January.

Post-production
The post production activities commenced during the final phase of shooting. Puneeth began dubbing for his role by the end of February. Eventually, he had to stop as the actor caught a cold. Later he completed his dubbing portion. Actor Vikram Singh who plays the villain role in the movie, completed his dubbing on 9 March 2015. Lead actress Anjali completed her voice dubbing for her role on 19 March 2015. It was reported that it was her first time dubbing for a Kannada film.

Music

V. Harikrishna, composed the music film, which marks his eighth collaboration with Puneeth Rajkumar. Director Pawan, in an interview with Filmibeat, said that there are 4 songs in the movie and Puneeth Rajkumar has crooned two songs for the movie. But later only one song sung by Puneeth was retained. Director Pavan has announced in his Twitter account that the songs of the Ranavikrama movie will be released on 10 April 2015. 
The audio album received mixed response from the listeners.

Release

Marketing
The film's first look was released on 17 March 2014 on the occasion of Puneeth Rajkumar's birthday in YouTube. The Teaser was of 54 seconds in which Puneeth jumps and shoots in a police uniform and a pair of jeans trousers with the Background Music notching the word "Vikrama Ranavikrama". The teaser of the movie was played in all theatres of Karnataka irrespective of the any language film which was being played at the centre. It was the first time that the trailer of a film was released across all theatres in Karnataka

The second teaser of the movie was released on 12 December 2014, along with the Tamil movie Lingaa. It was a 45-second teaser in which Puneeth was seen wielding an automatic rifle and seen shooting at the enemy.
 
The third teaser of the movie was released on 17 March 2015 on the occasions of Puneeth Rajkumar's 40 birthday. It was a 40-second video in which Puneeth was seen in a cop avatar, which is rumoured to be his character Vikram IPS, doing several high-octane action sequences.

References

External links
 

2010s Kannada-language films
2015 films
Films shot in Bangalore
Films shot in Milan
Films set in a fictional location
Films about corruption in India
Films set in Bangalore
Films set in London
Films set in 1947
Indian historical action films
Films set in the British Raj
Films set in the partition of India
2015 action thriller films
Indian action thriller films
Films about mining
2015 masala films
Films about terrorism in India
Films about nuclear war and weapons
Reliance Entertainment films
Films set in Karnataka
Films set in Maharashtra
Indian police films
Fictional portrayals of the Karnataka Police
Films directed by Pavan Wadeyar
2010s police films